A man-at-arms is a type of medieval and Renaissance soldier.

Man-at-arms, or its plural Men-at-arms, may also refer to:

 Men at Arms, a 1993 novel by Terry Pratchett
 Men at Arms (Waugh novel), a 1952 novel by Evelyn Waugh
Men at Arms (2005 film) an Estonian comedy originally titled Malev
 Man-At-Arms, a fictional character in the Masters of the Universe franchise
 A Man at Arms (novel), a 2021 historical novel by Steven Pressfield

See also 
 L'homme armé, a medieval musical motif
 Master-at-arms, a contemporary rank in some navies and armies